Pierre-Marie Dioudonnat (born 24 March 1945) is a French publisher, historian and political scientist.

Trained in prosopography, he specialises in family history. His name is closely associated with the Encyclopédie de la fausse noblesse et de la noblesse d'apparence, republished in 2002 and 2010 as Le Simili-nobiliaire français, which gathers data on 6,000 surviving French families whose present-day surname links to a false title of nobility.

Life
He was born in Neuilly-sur-Seine. He gained a diploma from the Institut d'études politiques de Paris in 1965 and in 1972 added a doctorate in political science

He stood for the National Front as a successor to Alexandra Bourgoin in the 8th 'circonscription' for Seine-Saint-Denis (93). His wife is Sabine Bragadir, with whom he wrote Dictionnaire des 10 000 dirigeants politiques français.

Works 
 Je suis partout, 1930–1944. Les maurrassiens devant la tentation fasciste, La Table ronde, 1973
 Encyclopédie de la fausse noblesse et de la noblesse d’apparence, Sedopols, republished from 1976 to 1997 
 Les Ivresses de l’Église de France : les évêques et la société 1801-1976, Le Sagittaire 1976 
 Dictionnaire des 10 000 dirigeants politiques français, avec Sabine Bragadir, Sedopols 1977
 L’argent nazi à la conquête de la presse française, 1940-1944, Jean Picollec, 1981
 Les 700 rédacteurs de "Je suis partout", Sedopols 1993 
 Le Simili-nobiliaire français, Sedopols 2002 
 republished 2010 
 Paroles d’évêques : 19e – 20e siècles : une anthologie du cléricalisme français, recueil de textes, Sedopols 2005 
 Demandes de changement de nom 1917–1943 : essai de répertoire analytique : biographie, généalogie, histoire sociale, Sedopols 2008

Prizes 
 Prix Robert-Brasillach 1974.

References

External links
 Open Library : Pierre-Marie Dioudonnat

Living people
French political scientists
1945 births
French publishers (people)
People from Neuilly-sur-Seine
20th-century French historians
21st-century French historians
French genealogists
National Rally (France) politicians